Las Baulas de Guanacaste Protected Zone, is a protected area in Costa Rica, managed under the Tempisque Conservation Area, it was created in 1991 by decree 20518-MIRENEM.

References 

Nature reserves in Costa Rica
Protected areas established in 1991